The Grand Hyatt Seoul is a 5-star luxury Hyatt hotel in Seoul, South Korea. Located in landscaped gardens in Yongsan district, on the historic Mount Namsan, the hotel has 602 rooms and suites and several F&B outlets.

Facilities 
The hotel's restaurants include  the Paris Grill which serves European cuisine, The Chinese Restaurant, J.J. Mahoney’s with live music, The Paris Bar and Helicon Song Bar.

The Presidential Suite is 325 square-meter with seven rooms  and floor-to-ceiling windows on the 20th floor which provide sprawling skyline views of Seoul.

In media 
The hotel was used as the filming location for  Seoul Broadcasting System (SBS)'s drama Lovers in Paris, namely the swimming pool, the lobby where the two leads kiss, The Paris Bar, where male lead, Han Ki-joo played by Park Shin-yang sang to Kang Tae-young played by Kim Jung-eun, J.J. Mahoney's, where the college hockey party held and the grand ballroom, where the engagement ceremony was held.

See also 
 Yongsan International School of Seoul
 Namsan (Seoul)

References

External links 

Official site

Hotels in Seoul
Hotel buildings completed in 1978
Hotels established in 1978
Hyatt Hotels and Resorts
Yongsan District